Kin Platt (December 8, 1911 – November 30, 2003) was an American writer, artist, painter, sculptor, caricaturist, and comics artist, best known for penning radio comedy and animated TV series, as well as children's mystery novels, one of which earned him the Mystery Writers of America Edgar Award.

He additionally wrote and drew comic books (creating an early talking animal superhero, Supermouse) and comic strips.

Biography

Early life and career
Kin Platt was born to Etta (née Hochberg) and Daniel Platt. In the mid-1930s he wrote radio comedy for George Burns, Jack Benny, the comedy team of Stoopnagle and Budd, and The National Biscuit Comedy Hour of 1936. Later in the 1930s, he wrote for Disney and Walter Lantz theatrical cartoons, and he scripted the Robert Benchley film How to Read (1938).

Comic books

He broke into comic books with humor stories featuring the character "Happy" in the Better Comics omnibus  Best Comics #1 (Nov. 1939). Platt went on to write and draw many features in the next few issues and to draw such features as "Captain Future" in Better's Startling Comics; "The Mask" (no relation to the 1990s Dark Horse Comics character), featuring a district attorney turned costumed crimefighter, in Exciting Comics; and writer Richard Hughes' Doc Savage-like "Doc Strange" (no relation to Marvel Comics' Dr. Strange), in Thrilling Comics.

After doing WWII military service with the U.S. Army Air Force's Air Transport Command from 1943–46, Platt began working for such comic-book companies as Timely Comics (the 1940s predecessor of Marvel Comics), for which his features included "Widjet Witch" in Comedy Comics); and Better/Nedor/Standard, where he created Supermouse in 1948. Additionally, Platt wrote for the Bob Hope and Jerry Lewis comics at DC. For two years he drew the adventures of Pepsi and Pete for the advertising strip, Pepsi Cola Cops.

Al Jaffee, then an editor of Timely's humor comics, recalled in 2004,

For the New York Herald Tribune Syndicate, Platt wrote and drew the comic strip Mr. and Mrs.(originally by Clare Briggs) from 1947–1963, and The Duke and the Duchess from 1950–1954. Additionally, he drew theatrical caricatures for such newspapers and magazines as The Village Voice and the Los Angeles Times.

In the 1960s, Platt scripted TV animation, including for the Hanna-Barbera series The Jetsons, The Flintstones, Yogi Bear, Top Cat and Jonny Quest (for which at one point he held the title of "story director"), as well as for Hal Seeger Productions' Milton the Monster.

Young-readers' literature
Plat began writing children's books and young-adult mysteries in 1961. He eventually published more than 30 books, including general-reader mysteries. His pseudonyms included Guy West, Alan West, Wesley Simon York, Nick Tall, Nick West, Noah Zark and Kirby Carr. Platt wrote several novels in the "Hitman" series under the name Kirby Carr.

Platt also returned to comics around this time, writing occasional stories for the DC Comics titles G.I. Combat, Our Army at War and Star Spangled War Stories in 1964. His final known comics credit is a 48-page adaptation of Robert Louis Stevenson's Dr. Jekyll and Mr. Hyde in Marvel Classics Comics #1 (1976).

Later career
The 1973 film Baxter!, a psychological drama starring Patricia Neal, was based on a book by Platt, The Boy Who Could Make Himself Disappear.

He continued writing books throughout the 1980s, though some novels remained unpublished. This material, as well as unpublished caricatures submitted to magazines and newspapers, was donated to the Howard Gotlieb Archival Research Center at Boston University. Big Max and the Missing Giraffe was published posthumously by HarperTrophy in 2005.

Awards
 1967 Edgar Award for juvenile mystery, for Sinbad and Me
 1970 Edgar Award nomination, for The Mystery of the Witch Who Wouldn't

Bibliography

Children's Books
Big Max, illustrated by Robert Lopshire (1965)
Walt Disney's Snow White and Donald Duck (Whitman, 1967; as Nick Tall)
Walt Disney's Donald Duck Buried Treasure, illustrated by Anthony Strobl (Whitman, 1968; as Nick Tall)
Woody Woodpecker and the Busy Beavers (Whitman, 1968; as Nick Tall)
Mystery of the Coughing Dragon (Alfred Hitchcock and the Three Investigators series, Book 14) (1970; as Nick West)
Mystery of the Nervous Lion  (Alfred Hitchcock and the Three Investigators series, Book 16) (1971; as Nick West)
 The Call of the Wild (comic book adaptation by Platt, illustrated by Fred Carrillo (Pendulum Press, 1973)
 Dr. Jekyll and Mr. Hyde (comic book adaptation by Platt, illustrated by Nestor Redondo) (Pendulum Press, 1973)
Robert Louis Stevenson: Kidnapped (comic book adaptation as Nick Tall, illustrated by Frank Redondo) (Pendulum Press, 1974)
Sir Arthur Conan Doyle: The Great Adventures of Sherlock Holmes (comic book adaptation as Nick Tall, illustrated by Nestor Redondo) (Pendulum Press, 1974)
Big Max and the Mystery of the Missing Moose (HarperCollins, 1977)
Darwin and the Great Beasts (Self-illustrated) (Greenwillow, 1992)
Big Max and the Mystery of the Missing Giraffe, illustrated by Lynne Cravath (HarperCollins, 2005)

Young Adult Books
The Boy Who Could Make Himself Disappear (Chilton, 1968)
Hey, Dummy (Chilton, 1971)
Chloris and the Creeps (Chilton, 1973)
Chloris and the Freaks (Bradbury, 1975)
Headman (Greenwillow, 1975)
The Terrible Love Life of Dudley Cornflower (Bradbury, 1976)
Run for Your Life (F. Watts, 1977)
Chloris and the Weirdos (Bradbury, 1978)
The Doomsday Gang (Greenwillow, 1978)
Dracula, Go Home (F. Watts, 1979)
The Ape Inside Me (Crowell, 1980)
Flames Going Out (Methuen, 1980)
Brogg's Brain (Crowell, 1981)
Frank and Stein and Me (F. Watts, 1982)
Crocker (Lippincott, 1983)
A Mystery for Thoreau (Farrar, Straus and Giroux, 2008)

"Steve Forrester" young-adult mysteries
The Blue Man (Harper, 1961)
Sinbad and Me (Chilton, 1966)
The Mystery of the Witch Who Wouldn't (Chilton, 1969)
The Ghost of Hellsfire Street (Delacorte, 1980)

Mysteries
Dead as They Come (Random House, 1972)
A Pride of Women (Robert Hale, 1974)
Murder in Rosslare (Walker, 1986)

"Max Roper" mysteries
The Pushbutton Butterfly (Random House, 1970)
The Kissing Gourami (Random House, 1970)
The Princess Stakes Murder (Random House, 1973)
The Giant Kill (Random House, 1974)
Match Point for Murder (Random House, 1975)
The Body Beautiful Murder (Random House, 1976)
The Screwball King Murder (Random House, 1978)

"Hitman" Series (as Kirby Carr)
Who Killed You, Cindy Castle (Canyon Books, 1974)
Let Me Kill You, Sweetheart (Canyon Books, 1974)
The Girls Who Came To Murder (Canyon Books, 1974)
They're Coming to Kill You, Jane (Canyon Books, 1975)
You Die Next, Jill Baby (Major Books, 1975)
You're Hired, You're Dead (Major Books, 1975)
Don't Bet on Living Alice (Major Books, 1975)
The Impossible Spy (Major Books, 1976)

Adult books (various pseudonyms)
Sex Heel as Guy West
Group Grope as Alan WestPandora as Guy York
Lovers & Exorcists as Wesley Simon York

Footnotes

References
Three Investigators Books (publishing-company site with Platt bio)
Lambiek Comiclopedia: Kin Platt
Al Jaffee interview, Alter Ego Vol. 3, #35 (April 2004)
The New York Times review of Baxter!

Milton the Monster Episode Guide
The Walter Lantz Cartune Encyclopedia: 1939

External links

All-Amazing Comics #9 (May 2001)  Reprint of seven-page story "The Mask" from Exciting Comics #20 (July 1942), art by Kin Platt
Broad Views Compilation of "Broad Views" cartoons by Kin Platt from the World War II soldier newspaper Hump Express

1911 births
2003 deaths
American children's writers
American radio writers
American comics artists
American television writers
American caricaturists
American humorists
20th-century American sculptors
20th-century American painters
Edgar Award winners
Golden Age comics creators
American male writers
The Village Voice people
Los Angeles Times people
20th-century American screenwriters